David John Tennant (né McDonald; born 18 April 1971) is a Scottish actor. He rose to fame for his role as the tenth incarnation of the Doctor in the BBC sci-fi series Doctor Who (2005–2010; 2013), returning to the show as the fourteenth incarnation of the character in 2022. His other notable roles include Giacomo Casanova in the BBC comedy-drama serial Casanova (2005), Barty Crouch Jr. in the fantasy film Harry Potter and the Goblet of Fire (2005), Peter Vincent in the horror remake Fright Night (2011), DI Alec Hardy in the ITV crime drama series Broadchurch (2013–2017), Kilgrave in the Netflix superhero series Jessica Jones (2015–2019), Crowley in the Amazon Prime fantasy series Good Omens (2019–present), and Phileas Fogg in Around the World in 80 Days (2021).

Tennant has worked extensively on stage, including a portrayal of the title character in a 2008 Royal Shakespeare Company production of Hamlet that was later adapted for television. He has also been a voice actor in The Pirates! In an Adventure with Scientists! (2011), Ferdinand (2017), Final Space (2018–2021), gen:LOCK (2019–present), the How to Train Your Dragon films (2010–2019), and as Scrooge McDuck in DuckTales (2017–2021). In 2015, he received the National Television Award for Special Recognition.

Early life 
Tennant was born David John McDonald in Bathgate on 18 April 1971, the son of Helen (née McLeod; 1940–2007) and Alexander "Sandy" McDonald (1937–2016). His father was a minister who served as the Moderator of the General Assembly of the Church of Scotland. He grew up with his brother Blair and sister Karen in Ralston, where his father was the local minister. Two of his maternal great-grandparents, William and Agnes Blair, were Northern Irish Protestants from County Londonderry who were among the signatories of the Ulster Covenant in 1912; William was also a member of the Orange Order. Tennant's maternal grandfather, footballer Archie McLeod, met William and Agnes' daughter Nellie while playing for Derry City FC. McLeod was descended from tenant farmers from the Isle of Mull.

At the age of three, Tennant told his parents that he wanted to become an actor because he was a fan of Doctor Who, but they encouraged him to aim for more conventional work. He later said that he was "absurdly single-minded" in pursuing an acting career. He watched almost every Doctor Who episode for years and once spoke to Fourth Doctor actor Tom Baker at a book-signing event in Glasgow. He was educated at Ralston Primary School and Paisley Grammar School and acted in various school productions. His talent was noticed by actress Edith MacArthur, who told his parents that she believed he would become a successful theatre actor after she saw him perform when he was 10 years old.

Tennant attended Saturday classes at the Royal Conservatoire of Scotland before passing an official audition at age 16, becoming one of their youngest students and studying there between the ages of 17 and 20. After discovering that there was another David McDonald already represented by the actor's union Equity, he created his stage name by adopting the surname of Pet Shop Boys frontman Neil Tennant, whom he had seen in Smash Hits magazine while deciding on a new name. He later legally changed his surname to comply with rules set by the American Screen Actors Guild (which was later merged into SAG-AFTRA).

Career

Early work
Tennant made his professional acting debut while still in secondary school. When he was 16, he acted in an anti-smoking film made by the Glasgow Health Board which aired on television and was also screened in schools. The following year, he played a role in an episode of Dramarama. Tennant's first professional role upon graduating from drama school was in a staging of The Resistible Rise of Arturo Ui co-starring Ashley Jensen; one of a few plays in which he performed as part of the agitprop 7:84 Theatre Company. He also made an early television appearance in the Scottish TV sitcom Rab C Nesbitt as a transgender barmaid called Davina. In the 1990s, he appeared in several plays at the Dundee Repertory Theatre.

Tennant was awarded his first major TV role as Campbell Bain in the BBC Scotland drama series Takin' Over the Asylum (1994), after impressing director David Blair during filming of another drama – Strathblair (1992). As Tennant recalled from the audition, "they needed someone who could believably act 19 and bonkers". During filming of Takin' Over the Asylum he met comic actress and writer Arabella Weir. When he moved to London shortly afterwards, he lodged with Weir for five years and became godfather to her youngest child. He has subsequently appeared with Weir in many productions: as a guest in her spoof television series Posh Nosh, in the Doctor Who audio drama Exile (during which Weir played an alternative version of the Doctor), and as panellists on the West Wing Ultimate Quiz on More4 (Weir later guest-starred on Doctor Who itself after Tennant left the series). One of his earliest big-screen roles was in Jude (1996), in which he shared a scene with Christopher Eccleston, playing a drunken undergraduate who challenges Eccleston's Jude to prove his intellect.

Tennant developed his career in the British theatre, frequently performing with the Royal Shakespeare Company. His first Shakespearean role for the RSC was in As You Like It (1996); having auditioned for the role of Orlando, the romantic lead, he was instead cast as the jester Touchstone, which he played in his natural Scottish accent. He subsequently specialised in comic roles, playing Antipholus of Syracuse in The Comedy of Errors and Captain Jack Absolute in The Rivals, although he also played the role of Romeo in Romeo and Juliet. He also starred in the 2003 London production of Martin McDonagh's The Pillowman.

Tennant contributed to several audio dramatisations of Shakespeare for the Arkangel Shakespeare series (1998). His roles include a reprisal of his Antipholus of Syracuse in The Comedy of Errors, as well as Launcelot Gobbo in The Merchant of Venice, Edgar in King Lear, and Mercutio in Romeo and Juliet, all of which he performs in his natural accent. In 1995, Tennant appeared at the Royal National Theatre, London, playing the role of Nicholas Beckett in Joe Orton's What the Butler Saw. In television, he appeared in the first episode of Reeves and Mortimer's revamped Randall and Hopkirk in 2000, playing an eccentric artist. During the Christmas season of 2002, he starred in a series of television advertisements for Boots the Chemists. In 2003 Tennant appeared in the film Bright Young Things. He was nominated for Laurence Olivier Award for Best Actor in a Leading Role in a Play for his performance in Kenneth Lonergan's Lobby Hero. The UK première was staged at the Donmar Warehouse, in previews on April 4, opening April 10 and closing on May 4, 2002. The cast also included Charlotte Randle (Dawn), with Dominic Rowan (Bill), and Gary McDonald (William), and was again directed by Mark Brokaw. This production transferred to the New Ambassadors Theatre from June 26 (opening July 1) to August 10, 2002. He began to appear on television more prominently in 2004 and 2005, when he appeared in a dramatisation of He Knew He Was Right (2004), Blackpool (2004), Casanova (2005), and The Quatermass Experiment (2005). Later that same year, he appeared as Barty Crouch Jr. in the film Harry Potter and the Goblet of Fire.

Doctor Who

Doctor Who returned to British screens in March 2005, with Christopher Eccleston playing the role of the Ninth Doctor in the first series. Tennant replaced him as of the second series, making his first, brief appearance as the Tenth Doctor in the episode "The Parting of the Ways" (2005) at the end of the regeneration scene, and also appeared in a special 7-minute mini-episode shown as part of the 2005 Children in Need appeal, broadcast on 18 November 2005. He began filming the new series of Doctor Who in late July 2005. His first full-length outing as the Doctor was a 60-minute special, "The Christmas Invasion", first broadcast on Christmas Day 2005. Tennant had been formally offered the role of the Doctor during rehearsals for The Quatermass Experiment. Although the casting was not officially announced until later in April, both castmates and crew became aware of the speculation surrounding Tennant; in the live broadcast Jason Flemyng (Quatermass) changed his first line to Tennant's Dr. Briscoe from "Good to have you back, Gordon" to "Good to have you back, Doctor" as a deliberate reference.

Tennant has expressed enthusiasm about fulfilling his childhood dream. He remarked in a radio interview: "Who wouldn't want to be the Doctor? I've even got my own TARDIS!" In 2006, readers of Doctor Who Magazine voted Tennant "Best Doctor" over perennial favourite Tom Baker. Writer Russell T Davies made the decision not to use Tennant's own Scottish accent for the character as he did not want the Doctor's accent "touring the regions", using Estuary English instead. Tennant has gone on record as saying that, contrary to tabloids reports, he was not upset at not being able to play the role in his own accent and in fact had never wanted to. However, he was pleased to be able to use his own accent in one episode, when the Doctor briefly masquerades as "Dr. James McCrimmon" of Edinburgh in Tooth and Claw – a nod to the Second Doctor's companion Jamie McCrimmon.

He previously had a small role in the BBC's animated Doctor Who webcast Scream of the Shalka. Not originally cast in the production, Tennant was recording a radio play in a neighbouring studio, and when he discovered what was being recorded next door convinced the director to give him a small role. This personal enthusiasm for the series had also been expressed by his participation in several audio plays based on the Doctor Who television series which had been produced by Big Finish Productions, although he did not play the Doctor in any of these productions. His first such role was in the Seventh Doctor audio Colditz, where he played a Nazi lieutenant guard at Colditz Castle. In 2004 Tennant played a lead role in the Big Finish audio play series Dalek Empire III as Galanar, a young man who is given an assignment to discover the secrets of the Daleks. In 2005, he starred in UNIT: The Wasting for Big Finish, recreating his role of Brimmicombe-Wood from a Doctor Who Unbound play, Sympathy for the Devil. In both audio productions, he worked alongside Nicholas Courtney, who reprised the character of Sir Alastair Gordon Lethbridge-Stewart. He also played an unnamed Time Lord in another Doctor Who Unbound play Exile. UNIT: The Wasting, was recorded between Tennant getting the role of the Doctor and it being announced. He played the title role in Big Finish's adaptation of Bryan Talbot's The Adventures of Luther Arkwright (2005). In 2006, he recorded abridged audio books of The Stone Rose by Jacqueline Rayner, The Feast of the Drowned by Stephen Cole and The Resurrection Casket by Justin Richards, for BBC Worldwide.

He made his directorial debut on the Doctor Who Confidential episode that accompanies Steven Moffat's episode "Blink", entitled "Do You Remember The First Time?", which aired on 9 June 2007. In 2007, Tennant's Tenth Doctor appeared with Peter Davison's Fifth Doctor in a Doctor Who special for Children in Need, written by Steven Moffat and entitled "Time Crash". He later performed alongside Davison's daughter, Georgia Moffett (as "Jenny") in the 2008 episode "The Doctor's Daughter". Georgia Moffett later became David Tennant's wife.

Tennant featured as the Doctor in an animated version of Doctor Who for Totally Doctor Who, The Infinite Quest, which aired on CBBC. He also starred as the Doctor in another animated six-part Doctor Who series, Dreamland. Tennant guest starred as the Doctor in a two-part story in Doctor Who spin-off The Sarah Jane Adventures, broadcast in October 2009. He continued to play the Tenth Doctor into the revived programme's fourth series in 2008. However, on 29 October 2008, he announced that he would be stepping down from the role after three full series. He played the Doctor in four special episodes in 2009, before his final episode aired on 1 January 2010, where he was replaced by the Eleventh Doctor, portrayed by Matt Smith.

Tennant and Billie Piper returned to Doctor Who for the 50th anniversary special, "The Day of the Doctor" broadcast on 23 November 2013, with then-stars Matt Smith and Jenna-Louise Coleman and guest star John Hurt. The same month, he also appeared in the one-off 50th anniversary comedy homage The Five(ish) Doctors Reboot directed by Peter Davison.

In October 2015, Big Finish Productions announced that Tennant would return to the role of the Tenth Doctor alongside Catherine Tate as his former companion Donna Noble in three new stories from Big Finish. The stories feature current and previous Doctor Who actors, including Strax actor Dan Starkey, former Davros actor Terry Molloy, and many veterans of Big Finish, including Niky Wardley, who portrayed Eighth Doctor companion Tamsin. The three stories were released in May 2016.

In November 2017, three new audio dramas were released by Big Finish Productions with Tennant once again starring as the Tenth Doctor, alongside Billie Piper as Rose Tyler. Tennant also returned to the role on 13 July 2018, as part of the live Muppets show The Muppets Take the O2 in London (in which the Tenth Doctor appeared onstage as part of a live Pigs in Space sketch).

In May 2022, in relation to the show's 60th anniversary, it was announced that Tennant would once again return to the show, alongside Tate, who would reprise her role as Donna Noble. Previously thought to be returning as the Tenth Doctor, in October 2022, the ending of the special episode "The Power of the Doctor" revealed that Tennant would return as the Fourteenth Doctor, a role previously thought to be played by Ncuti Gatwa, who would follow on as the Fifteenth Doctor instead. The three 60th anniversary special episodes will air in November 2023.

2005–2010
While playing the Doctor, Tennant was also in the early December 2005 ITV drama Secret Smile. His performance as Jimmy Porter in Look Back in Anger at the Theatre Royal, Bath, and Lyceum Theatre, Edinburgh, was recorded by the National Video Archive of Performance for the Victoria and Albert Museum Theatre Collection. He revived this performance for the anniversary of the Royal Court Theatre in a rehearsed reading. In January 2006, he took a one-day break from shooting Doctor Who to play Richard Hoggart in a dramatisation of the 1960 Lady Chatterley's Lover obscenity trial, The Chatterley Affair. The play was written by Andrew Davies and directed by Doctor Whos James Hawes for the digital television channel BBC Four. Hoggart's son, Simon, praised Tennant's performance in The Guardian newspaper.

On 25 February 2007, Tennant starred in Recovery, a 90-minute BBC One drama written by Tony Marchant. He played Alan, a self-made building site manager who attempted to rebuild his life after suffering a debilitating brain injury. His costar in the drama was friend Sarah Parish, with whom he had previously appeared in Blackpool and an episode of Doctor Who. She joked that "we're like George and Mildred – in 20 years' time we'll probably be doing a ropey old sitcom in a terraced house in Preston". Later that same year he starred in Learners, a BBC comedy drama written by and starring Jessica Hynes (another Doctor Who costar, in the episodes "Human Nature", "The Family of Blood" and "The End of Time"), in which he played a Christian driving instructor who became the object of a student's affection. Learners was broadcast on BBC One on 11 November 2007. Tennant had a cameo appearance as the Doctor in the 2007 finale episode of the BBC/HBO comedy series Extras with Ricky Gervais. In November 2008, Tennant played Sir Arthur Eddington in the BBC and HBO biographical film Einstein and Eddington, which was filmed in Cambridge and Hungary. Tennant was the "Star in a Reasonably Priced Car" on Top Gear in December 2007, where he claimed to have unsuccessfully auditioned for a role on Taggart 26 times. Tennant is the voice behind the 2007 advertising campaign for catalogue retailer Argos, and appeared in adverts for The Proclaimers' 2007 album and learndirect in June 2008. Tennant also lent his voice to adverts for Tesco Mobile, Nintendo Wii, and American Express.

Tennant featured in an episode of Trick or Treat on Channel 4 in May 2008. The episode showed Tennant apparently predicting future events correctly by using automatic writing. In TV & Satellite Week  (26 April – 2 May issue), the host of the show, Derren Brown, is quoted as saying: "One of the appeals of Doctor Who for David is time travel, so I wanted to give him that experience. He was open and up for it, and I got a good reaction. He's a real screamer!". Tennant also returned for the final episode of the series with the rest of the participants from the other episodes in the series to take part in one final experiment. Tennant appeared in the 2008 episode "Holofile 703: Us and Phlegm" of the radio series Nebulous (a parody of Doctor Who) in the role of Doctor Beep, using his Lothian accent. Also in 2008, he voiced the character of Hamish the Hunter in the 2008 English language DVD re-release of the 2006 animated Norwegian film, Free Jimmy, alongside Woody Harrelson. The English-language version of the film has dialogue written by Simon Pegg, who also starred in it as a main voice actor.

In early 2009, Tennant narrated the digital planetarium space dome film "We Are Astronomers" commissioned by the UK's National Space Centre. On 13 March 2009, he presented Red Nose Day 2009 with Davina McCall. He joined Franz Ferdinand onstage to play the guitar on their song "No You Girls" on a special Comic Relief edition of Top of the Pops. In summer 2009, Tennant filmed St. Trinian's II: The Legend of Fritton's Gold. The film was released in December 2009. From October 2009, he hosted the Masterpiece Contemporary programming strand on the American Public Broadcasting Service. In December 2009, he filmed the lead in an NBC pilot, Rex Is Not Your Lawyer, playing Rex, a Chicago lawyer who starts to coach clients to represent themselves when he starts suffering panic attacks. The pilot was not picked up and the project was shelved. In November 2009, he co-hosted the Absolute Radio Breakfast Show with Christian O'Connell for three consecutive days. He returned to cohost the show for one day in October 2010. On 7 March 2010, he also appeared as George in a one-part BBC Radio 4 adaptation of Of Mice and Men in the Classic Serial strand. In October 2010 he starred as Dave, a man struggling to raise five children after the death of his partner, in the British drama Single Father. For this role he was nominated as Best Actor at the Royal Television Society Programme Awards 2010.

Despite much of his work being television work, Tennant has described theatre work as his "default way of being". He joined the Royal Shakespeare Company (RSC), to play Hamlet with Patrick Stewart and Berowne in Love's Labours Lost in 2008. From August to November 2008 he appeared at the Courtyard Theatre in Stratford-upon-Avon as Hamlet, playing that role in repertory with Berowne that October and November. Hamlet transferred to the Novello Theatre in London's West End in December 2008, but Tennant suffered a prolapsed disc during previews and was unable to perform from 8 December 2008 until 2 January 2009, during which time the role was played by his understudy Edward Bennett. He returned to his role in the production on 3 January 2009, and appeared until the run ended on 10 January. Tennant's performance of Hamlet was critically acclaimed. In 2009, he worked on a TV film version of the RSC's 2008 Hamlet for BBC Two. On 12 April 2011, a photograph of Tennant as Hamlet featured on a stamp issued by the Royal Mail to mark the RSC's fiftieth anniversary.

2011–2015 

In 2011, he starred in United, about the Manchester United "Busby Babes" team and the 1958 Munich air disaster, playing coach and assistant manager Jimmy Murphy. In September 2011, he appeared in a guest role in one episode of the comedy series This is Jinsy, and also started filming True Love, a semi-improvised BBC One drama series, on location in Margate, Kent; the series aired in June 2012. Later in September 2011, it was announced that Tennant would voice a character in the movie adaptation of Postman Pat named You Know You're the One with a planned 3D theatrical release for spring 2013. In October 2011, Tennant started shooting the semi-improvised comedy film, Nativity 2: Danger in the Manger  in Coventry. He played dual roles: the main character, put-upon teacher Mr. Peterson, and his "golden boy" twin brother and rival.

In April 2012, Tennant played lead in a one-off drama The Minor Character for Sky Arts. Between April and June, he filmed Spies of Warsaw for BBC Four, in the lead role of Jean-François Mercier. This drama series shot in Poland is an adaptation of Alan Furst's novel The Spies of Warsaw. Tennant auditioned for the role of Hannibal Lecter in NBC's Hannibal; he was narrowly beaten for the part by Mads Mikkelsen. On 9 June 2012, he started filming the 3-part political drama series The Politician's Husband for BBC Two, playing an ambitious cabinet minister who takes drastic action when his wife's career starts to outshine his. Tennant also presented the new comedy quiz show Comedy World Cup, in 2012 which ran on Saturday nights for seven episodes.

In January 2012, Tennant was appointed to the Royal Shakespeare Company board, to be on the selection committee interviewing and choosing the new artistic director. It was announced on 23 January 2013 that Tennant would return to the RSC for the company's 2013 winter season, playing the title role in Richard II at Stratford-upon-Avon (from 10 October to 16 November) and transferring to the Barbican Centre in London (from 9 December to 25 January 2014). Tennant repeated his performance as Richard II in the RSC's 'King and Country' cycle in 2016, starting at the Barbican Theatre in London before transferring to the Brooklyn Academy of Music in New York.

Tennant starred in the ITV detective series Broadchurch as DI Alec Hardy between 2013 and 2017. The first series was filmed in Clevedon, North Somerset, and Bridport, Dorset, between August and November 2012, and aired in March 2013. Tennant filmed the second series of Broadchurch during mid-2014, and the third between May and October 2016. Between January and May 2014, Tennant also filmed the US remake of Broadchurch, re-titled Gracepoint.

Between late January and March 2013, Tennant filmed The Escape Artist for BBC One in which he played a talented junior barrister who had yet to lose a case. The three-part series aired on BBC One in October and November 2013. Tennant starred opposite Rosamund Pike and Billy Connolly in What We Did on Our Holiday, a semi-improvised comedy film; shooting took place from 17 June to 30 July 2013 in Scotland. The film was released in September 2014.

In 2012 he appeared in a multi-million-pound campaign for Virgin Media, starring in three adverts. One advert was voluntarily withdrawn after a complaint lodged by BBC Worldwide, which believed that the advert broke the corporation's guidelines by featuring references to Doctor Who that appeared to be a commercial endorsement of the service. He is the narrator on Xbox One video game Kinect Sports Rivals, released in 2014.

Tennant also portrayed the villainous Kilgrave in Jessica Jones, a television series from Marvel and Netflix. All 13 episodes were released on 20 November 2015.

On 9 February 2015, Tennant appeared on the Radio 4 panel show Just a Minute, becoming the show's most successful debut contestant. He also voiced the Propaganda Minister in the 2015 Square Enix video game Just Cause 3. In autumn 2015, Tennant's name was announced for Scottish feature film I Feel Fine, a thriller set in Glasgow in the 1980s. However, the film has been postponed indefinitely.

2016–2019 

In February 2016, he began filming Mad to Be Normal (previously titled Metanoia), a biopic of the renowned Scottish psychiatrist R. D. Laing, produced by Gizmo Films.

In 2017, Tennant appeared in writer/director Daisy Aitkens' first feature film, You, Me and Him. The film is co-produced by Tennant's wife, Georgia, and had originally been due to co-star his father-in-law, Peter Davison; however, Davison withdrew from the film in October 2016 due to a scheduling clash. Between March and June 2017 Tennant appeared in Patrick Marber's Don Juan in Soho at the Wyndham's Theatre. Also in 2017, he became the voice of Scrooge McDuck for Disney XD's DuckTales reboot, replacing the character's longtime voice actor Alan Young, who died in May 2016.

Tennant played psychopathic villain Cale Erendreich in the thriller film Bad Samaritan (2018), written by Brandon Boyce and directed by Dean Devlin. Tennant also plays Crowley in the miniseries Good Omens, which was released in full on Amazon Prime Video on 31 May 2019 and was released on BBC Two on 15 January 2020.

In February 2019, Tennant launched his own podcast, titled David Tennant Does a Podcast With... The podcast's episodes feature Olivia Colman, Whoopi Goldberg, Jodie Whittaker, Ian McKellen, Jon Hamm, Gordon Brown, Jennifer Garner, Catherine Tate, Krysten Ritter, James Corden, Samantha Bee, Tina Fey, and Michael Sheen.

2020–present 
Tennant stars as a doctor suspected of murdering his family in Deadwater Fell, a Scottish true crime miniseries, which premiered in January 2020 on Channel 4. He also received his first credit as an executive producer for the series.

In September 2020, he portrayed Scottish serial killer Dennis Nilsen in Des, a three-part miniseries on ITV. For his performance, he won the International Emmy Award for Best Actor.

In 2020, 2021 and 2022 he starred in three seasons of the TV series Staged, with Michael Sheen. Joel Golby of the Guardian described it: "David Tennant and Michael Sheen squabbled over Zoom as exaggerated, frustrated, hyper-thespian versions of themselves, in an actors-playing-actors miniseries with the exact same energy of a late-night Comic Relief sketch; 15-minute episodes where you got to see familiar actors with their off-duty haircuts saying words that seemed real. It was good, and it was smart, and it played perfectly with the boundaries of the format it was in."

In September 2022, Tennant starred as Reverend Harry Watling in BBC1's Inside Man, which was written by Steven Moffat. The series premiered on 26 September 2022 to mixed reviews from viewers and critics alike.

In December 2022, Tennant starred as Alexander Litvinenko in the ITV1 dramatisation Litvinenko. The drama was based on the 10-year fight of Marina Litvinenko and the London police force as they work to prove the guilt and release the names of those responsible for the 2006 poisoning of Litvinenko.

Public image
Tennant was named "Coolest Man on TV" of 2007 in a Radio Times survey. He won the National Television Awards award for Most Popular Actor in 2006, 2007, 2008, and 2010. He was voted 16th Sexiest Man in the World by a 2008 Cosmopolitan survey.

In 2008, Tennant was voted "Greenest Star on the Planet" in an online vote held by Playhouse Disney as part of the Playing for the Planet Awards.

Tennant was ranked the 24th most influential person in the British media on 9 July 2007, according to MediaGuardian. He appeared in the paper's annual media rankings in 2006. In December 2008, he was named as one of the most influential people in show business by British theatre and entertainment magazine The Stage, making him the fifth actor to achieve a ranking in the top 20 (in a list typically dominated by producers and directors). He was voted the third best dressed man in Britain in GQ reader's poll for 2013. Tennant's popularity has led to impersonations of him on various social networking sites, leading the BBC to issue a statement making it clear that Tennant does not use any of these sites and any account or message purporting to be from him is fake. In the expansion EverQuest: Seeds of Destruction for the game EverQuest, a character was introduced called Tavid Dennant, named after David Tennant. The character when interacted with makes a number of references to Doctor Who.

In December 2005, The Stage placed Tennant at No. 6 in its "Top Ten" list of the most influential British television artists of the year, citing his roles in Blackpool, Casanova, Secret Smile, and Doctor Who. In January 2006, readers of the British gay and lesbian newspaper The Pink Paper voted him the "Sexiest Man in the Universe". In October 2006, he was named "Scotland's most stylish male" in the Scottish Style Awards.

Tennant is an ambassador for Worldwide Cancer Research.

Politics
A self-proclaimed liberal and socialist, Tennant is a supporter of the Labour Party and appeared in a party political broadcast for them in 2005. He declared his support for then-Prime Minister Gordon Brown in 2010, and labelled David Cameron a "terrifying prospect". In April 2010, he lent his voice to a Labour election broadcast. In 2012, he introduced Labour Party leader Ed Miliband onstage at the Labour Party Conference. In 2015, he also lent his voice to a Labour Party General Election broadcast.

Tennant remained neutral on the issue of Scottish independence in the run-up to the 2014 referendum, stating that it was not his business as he no longer lived in Scotland. However, in the wake of Brexit, which he called "depressing", he stated in 2017 that he would support an independent Scotland in the event of a second referendum.

Personal life
Tennant rarely discusses his private life in interviews, citing his belief that "relationships are hard enough with the people you're having them with, let alone talking about them in public". He has said that he believes religion "must have" shaped his character, and revealed that he is an occasional churchgoer.

Tennant is married to English actress Georgia Moffett, making him the son-in-law of actress Sandra Dickinson and Fifth Doctor actor Peter Davison. The couple met in 2008 during the filming of the Doctor Who episode "The Doctor's Daughter", in which she played the genetically engineered daughter of Tennant's Tenth Doctor. They married on 30 December 2011, and live in the Chiswick district of London. They have five children, including actor Ty Tennant, Moffett's child from a previous relationship whom Tennant adopted. Ty has acted in the film Tolkien and the 2019 television adaptation of War of the Worlds. The couple's daughter Olive was born in 2011. At the age of two, Olive had a cameo as John Barrowman's daughter in The Five(ish) Doctors Reboot. Later, at 10 years old, she made her debut in Kenneth Branagh's film Belfast. In 2013, Tennant and Moffett had a son named Wilfred. In November 2015, Tennant announced that they had recently had a daughter named Doris. In 2019, they had another daughter named Birdie.

Filmography

Bibliography

Forewords

Awards and nominations

References

Further reading
 Smallwood, Robert (editor) (2000). Players of Shakespeare 4: Further Essays in Shakespearean Performance by Players with the Royal Shakespeare Company, David Tennant on playing Touchstone in As You Like It, pp. 30–44. Cambridge University Press; 
 Smallwood, Robert (editor) (2005). Players of Shakespeare 5: Further Essays in Shakespearean Performance by Players with the Royal Shakespeare Company, David Tennant on playing Romeo in Romeo and Juliet, pp. 113–130. Cambridge University Press; 
 Mitchell, Molly (2009). David Tennant. London: Orion Publishing Group;

External links

 
 
 
 
 Hamlet,  (3:05:52), Great Performances, PBS, 28 April 2008 (video-only link)

1971 births
20th-century Scottish male actors
21st-century Scottish male actors
Alumni of the Royal Conservatoire of Scotland
Audiobook narrators
Critics' Circle Theatre Award winners
Daytime Emmy Award winners

Labour Party (UK) people
Living people
Male actors from Paisley, Renfrewshire
People educated at Paisley Grammar School
People from Bathgate
Royal Shakespeare Company members
Scottish male film actors
Scottish male stage actors
Scottish male television actors
Scottish male video game actors
Scottish male voice actors
Scottish male Shakespearean actors
Scottish people of Northern Ireland descent
Scottish podcasters
Scottish Protestants
Scottish socialists
Comic Relief people
International Emmy Award for Best Actor winners